Glenville GAA is a Gaelic Athletic Association club based in the village of Glenville, Cork, Ireland. This is a Gaelic football only club. The club participates in Cork county board and in Imokilly GAA divisional competitions.

Achievements
 Cork Junior Football Championship Winners (1) 1995
 Cork Minor A Football Championship Runners-Up 1993
 Cork Minor Championship (country section) Winners (1) 1994
 East Cork Junior A Football Championship Winners (7) 1948, 1961, 1972, 1973, 1978, 1979, 1995  Runners-Up 1945, 1965, 1971, 1974, 1975, 1982, 1983, 1984, 1985, 1994
 East Cork Junior B Football Championship Winners (1) 1997
 East Cork Junior C Football Championship Winners (2) 2013, 2017
 Intermediate Football League Winners (2) 2005, 2007
 Tom Creedon Cup Winners 2007
 East Cork Under-21 A Football Championship Winners (2) 1998, 2006
 East Cork Under-21 B Football Championship Winners (4) 1982, 1989, 2014, 2017
 East Cork Minor A Championship Winners (2) 1993, 2003    Runners-up 2011
 East Cork Minor B Championship Winners  (3) 1986, 1988, 1990 Runners-up 2012

Notable players
 Éamonn Ryan Cork Senior player

References

Gaelic games clubs in County Cork
Gaelic football clubs in County Cork